Stefanie Dolson (born January 8, 1992) is an American professional basketball player for the New York Liberty of the Women's National Basketball Association (WNBA). She was drafted sixth overall in the 2014 WNBA draft. Dolson played center for the UConn women's basketball team and won back-to-back national championships in 2013 and 2014. She won a gold medal in Women's 3x3 basketball at the 2020 Summer Olympics.

High school career
Dolson played volleyball and basketball at Minisink Valley High School in Slate Hill, New York and was a member of the National Honor Society. During her junior year she averaged 18.9 points, 16.7 rebounds, 5.0 assists and 6.2 blocks. As a senior, she averaged 22.8 points, 17.6 rebounds, 5.6 assists and 5.2 blocks.

Dolson led Minisink Valley High School to four straight New York State Public High School Athletic Association Section 9 championship game appearances and finished her career at Minisink Valley with 1,951 points and 1,607 rebounds. She was a McDonald's High School All-American and participated in the All-Star game where she had 12 points and eight rebounds in the McDonald's All-American Game.

College career

Freshman year
As a freshman for UConn in 2010–11, Dolson averaged 10.2 points and 6.1 rebounds per game on the season. On March 8, Dolson recorded 24 points and 9 rebounds in a 73–64 win over Notre Dame at the Big East tournament title game. She was named to the BIG EAST All-Tournament Team. Dolson was subsequently named to the Big East Rookie Team alongside teammate Bria Hartley.

Sophomore year
Dolson completed her sophomore season averaging  23.9 minutes, 10.4 points, 6.0 rebounds and 1.5 blocks per game. Dolson started her second year in strong form, however, her output slowed, and her scoring average dropped below ten points for her last eighteen regular season games. At the Final Four, Dolson came back strong, she scored 20 points in the overtime loss to Notre Dame.

Junior year
In her junior season, Dolson was named to the All-BIG EAST First Team after leading the Huskies in rebounding (7.1) and finishing third on the team in scoring (13.6). She posted career-high four double-doubles. Dolson made her third-straight All-BIG EAST Tournament team after posting a double-double 18-points and 14 rebounds effort in the 61–59 loss to Notre Dame in the BIG EAST Championship Final. She helped the Huskies win the 2013 NCAA championship and subsequently being named to the All-Final Four team.

Senior year

Dolson recorded 371 rebounds, the second most rebounds in school history. Her 93 blocks was the third most in a single season history. She helped lead her team to an undefeated 40–0 season and the 2014 National Championship, was named to the 2014 NCAA Final Four All-Tournament team, and was later inducted into the Huskies of Honor on senior night. Dolson led UConn to a 144–11 record over her four-year career, which included four Final Four appearances and back to back National Championships. She finished her career ranking 12th in points (1,797), fourth in field goal percentage (.588), fourth in rebounds (1,101), and fourth in blocks (253).

College statistics

Professional career

WNBA

Washington Mystics (2014–17) 

Dolson was drafted sixth overall in the 2014 WNBA Draft by Washington Mystics. UConn teammate Bria Hartley was drafted right after her by the Seattle Storm and thereafter traded to the Mystics.  On June 1, 2014, in a triple-overtime victory against the Los Angeles Sparks, the UConn duo of Dolson and Hartley combined for 34 points coming off the bench and Dolson recorded her first career double-double with 14 points and 11 rebounds. In her first career start on August 14, 2014, Dolson had her second career double-double with 12 points and 10 rebounds in a regular season loss to the Chicago Sky. The Mystics finished third place in the Eastern Conference but were swept in the first round of the playoffs by the Indiana Fever.

In the 2015 WNBA season opener against the Connecticut Sun, Dolson had a stand out dominating performance scoring 18 points and 12 rebounds in a winning effort. Later on in the season, she was selected into the 2015 WNBA All-Star Game as a reserve. Throughout the season, Dolson averaged career-highs in scoring and rebounding. The Mystics would once again reach the playoffs, with the fourth seed in the Eastern Conference, but were yet again a first round exit, losing to the New York Liberty in three games. In the 2016 season, Dolson continued to flourish as a player in the Mystics' starting lineup. In a win against the New York Liberty, she scored a career-high 23 points. During that game, she had also achieved career-highs in field goals made and three-pointers made However, the Mystics would miss the playoffs with a disappointing 13–21 record.

Chicago Sky (2017–2022) 
After three seasons with the Mystics, Dolson was traded to the Chicago Sky along with teammate Kahleah Copper, and the second overall pick in the 2017 WNBA draft, for Elena Delle Donne.

On May 14, 2017, in her debut with the Sky, Dolson scored 9 points along with 2 rebounds in a 70–61 loss to the Minnesota Lynx. On May 21, 2017, Dolson tied her career-high of 23 points along with 8 rebounds and a new career-high of 5 blocks in a 75–71 victory over the Atlanta Dream. Two months later, on July 28, 2017, Dolson scored a new career-high of 29 points in an 86–80 loss to the Phoenix Mercury. By the end of the season, Dolson averaged new career-highs in scoring and rebounding with 14.5 ppg and 5.8 rpg, but the Sky finished 12-22 and were eliminated from playoff contention.

In February 2018, Dolson re-signed with the Sky to a multi-year deal in free agency. In 2018, the Sky missed out on the playoffs as they finished with a 13–21 record.

Overseas
In the 2014-15 WNBA off-season, Dolson played in Russia for WBC Spartak Moscow Region. In the 2015-16 WNBA off-season, Dolson played in Turkey for Mersin Büyükşehir Belediyesi. In the 2016-17 WNBA off-season, Dolson briefly played in China for the Sichuan Whale. In 2017, Dolson signed with Dike Napoli of the Italian League for the 2017-18 WNBA off-season. In October 2018, Dolson signed with the Henan Phoenix of the Chinese League for the 2018-19 off-season.

WNBA career statistics

Regular season

|-
| style='text-align:left;'|2014
| style='text-align:left;'|Washington
| 34 || 1 || 18.4 || .492 || .000 || .811 || 4.4 || 1.2 || 0.4 || 1.1 || 1.7 || 6.0
|-
| style='text-align:left;'|2015
| style='text-align:left;'|Washington
| 34 || 33 || 24.7 || .495 || .476 || .871 || 5.6 || 1.6 || 0.5 || 1.1 || 1.9 || 10.6
|-
| style='text-align:left;'|2016
| style='text-align:left;'|Washington
| 34 || 31 || 22.5 || .482 || .300 || .843 || 4.7 || 1.1 || 0.4 || 0.9 || 1.1 || 9.3
|-
| style='text-align:left;'|2017
| style='text-align:left;'|Chicago
| 33 || 33 || 29.3 || .561 || .437 || .870 || 5.8 || 2.6 || 0.5 || 1.3 || 2.5 || 14.5
|-
| style='text-align:left;'|2018
| style='text-align:left;'|Chicago
| 27 || 25 || 27.6 || .467 || .346 || .938 || 4.6 || 3.0 || 0.6 || 0.9 || 1.8 || 9.7
|-
| style='text-align:left;'|2019
| style='text-align:left;'|Chicago
| 34 || 34 || 25.0 || .519 || .361 || .898 || 5.6 || 2.2 || 0.6 || 1.0 || 1.9 || 9.3
|-
| style='text-align:left;'|2020
| style='text-align:left;'|Chicago
| 15 || 8 || 18.2 || .486 || .375 || .737 || 3.5 || 1.7 || 0.4 || 0.9 || 1.0 || 6.3
|-
| style="text-align:left;background:#afe6ba;"|2021
| style='text-align:left;'|Chicago
| 24 || 15 || 20.0 || .486 || .404 || .947 || 3.5 || 1.3 || 0.3 || 0.8 || 1.3 || 7.5
|-
| style='text-align:left;'|2022
| style='text-align:left;'|New York
| 36 || 36 || 22.9 || .493 || .394 || .905 || 4.8 || 1.8 || 0.4 || 0.8 || 1.6 || 8.1
|-
| style='text-align:left;'| Career
| style='text-align:left;'| 9 years, 3 teams
| 271 || 216 || 23.5 || .503 || .383 || .869 || 4.8 || 1.8 || 0.4 || 1.0 || 1.7 || 9.2

Playoffs

|-
| style="text-align:left;"| 2014
| style="text-align:left;"| Washington
| 2 || 0 || 18.8 || .300 || .000 || 1.000 || 1.5 || 0.5 || 0.0 || 1.0 || 2.5 || 5.0
|-
| style="text-align:left;"| 2015
| style="text-align:left;"| Washington
| 3 || 3 || 22.0 || .480 || .000 || .750 || 5.3 || 1.0 || 0.3 || 1.3 || 0.3 || 9.0
|-
| style="text-align:left;"| 2019
| style="text-align:left;"| Chicago
| 2 || 2 || 28.0 || .600 || .571 || 1.000 || 7.0 || 3.0 || 0.5 || 1.0 || 1.0 ||14.5
|-
| style="text-align:left;"| 2020
| style="text-align:left;"| Chicago
| 1 || 0 || 16.0 || .250 || .000 || || 2.0 || 3.0 || 0.0 || 1.0 || 0.0 || 2.0
|-
| style="text-align:left;background:#afe6ba;"| 2021
| style="text-align:left;"| Chicago
| 10 || 0 || 16.8 || .512 || .294 || 1.000 || 2.8 || 1.1 || 0.2 || 0.7 || 1.1 || 4.9
|-
| style="text-align:left;"| 2022
| style="text-align:left;"| New York
| 3 || 3 || 26.3 || .444 || .600 || .000 || 3.7 || 2.7 || 0.0 || 1.0 || 0.3 || 6.3
|-
| style="text-align:left;"| Career
| style="text-align:left;"| 6 years, 3 teams
| 21 || 8 || 20.1 || .483 || .364 || .909 || 3.5 || 1.5 || 0.2 || 0.9 || 1.0 || 6.5

USA Basketball
Dolson was named to the USA Basketball U18 team. The USA team was one of eight teams from North, South and Central America, along with the Caribbean, invited to participate in the 2010 FIBA Americas U18 Championship for Women, held at the U.S. Olympic Training Center, in Colorado Springs, Colorado. The 2010 USA Basketball U18 National Team that compiled a perfect 5–0, earned the 2010 FIBA 
Americas Championship gold medal and qualified the US for the 2011 FIBA U19 World Championship.

Dolson was named to the USA Basketball U19 team. The 2011 USA Basketball U19 World Championship Team that posted an 8–1 record and captured the gold medal in Valdivia, Chile.

In 2021, Dolson was part of the USA team that won the first Olympic gold medal in 3x3 basketball. They defeated the Russian Olympic Committee in the gold medal game.

Personal life
Dolson is a descendant of the 17th century Minisink, NY-area settler and beaver-pelt trader James Dolson, for whom a major commercial roadway is now named; he had five sons, one of whom died in the American Revolution. The daughter of Steve and Kristal Dolson. Dolson has two older sisters Ashley and Courtney and one younger brother Jake.

In 2016, Dolson publicly came out as a member of the LGBTQ community. She spoke out on her sexuality in an interview with ESPN Magazine by saying: "Not everyone in the WNBA needs to be out, but I feel called to lead an authentic life in the open. I know who I am and I don't care if people judge me. I am 6-5, and I dye my hair purple and experiment a lot with fashion. My motto is: If they're going to stare, they might as well stare at something fun. There are a lot of girls who struggle being who they are. We need people who are out so that those girls know it's OK to be themselves, regardless of stereotypes. By being open, I give them someone to look up to, and however they identify, I can inspire them to support equality and LGBT issues."

In 2019, Dolson played on the "Away" roster during the NBA All-Star Celebrity Game at the Bojangles' Coliseum in Charlotte, North Carolina.

Awards and honors
 Two-Time BIG EAST Freshman of the Week
 2010–11 BIG EAST All–Rookie Team
 2010–11 BIG EAST All–Tournament Team
 2011–12 Wooden Award Preseason Top–30
 2011–12 Preseason Wade Watch List
 2011–12 Preseason All–BIG EAST Honorable Mention
 2011–12 Preseason Naismith Award Watch List
 2011–12 BIG EAST All–Tournament Team
 2011–12 All–BIG EAST Honorable Mention
 2011–12 NCAA All–Kingston Regional Team
 2012–13 Wooden Award Preseason Top–30
 2012–13 Naismith Award Preseason Watch List
 2012–13 BIG EAST All–Tournament Team
 2012–13 All–BIG EAST First Team
 2012–13 Associated Press All–America Third Team
 2012–13 USBWA All–America Team
 2012–13 WBCA/State Farm All–America Team
 2013–14 Senior Class Award
 2013–14 AAC Defensive Player of the Year
 2013-14 WBCA National Defensive Player of the Year

References

External links
USA Basketball's Stefanie Dolson Fact Checks Her Wikipedia at NBC New York

1992 births
Living people
3x3 basketball players at the 2020 Summer Olympics
All-American college women's basketball players
American expatriate basketball people in China
American women's basketball players
American women's 3x3 basketball players
Basketball players from New York (state)
Centers (basketball)
Chicago Sky players
Henan Phoenix players
LGBT basketball players
LGBT people from New York (state)
Lesbian sportswomen
McDonald's High School All-Americans
Medalists at the 2020 Summer Olympics
New York Liberty players
Olympic gold medalists for the United States in 3x3 basketball
Olympic 3x3 basketball players of the United States
Parade High School All-Americans (girls' basketball)
UConn Huskies women's basketball players
Washington Mystics draft picks
Washington Mystics players
Women's National Basketball Association All-Stars